Downpatrick Cricket Club is a cricket club in Downpatrick, County Down, Northern Ireland, formerly playing in the NCU Senior League.

The club's Strangford Road ground has hosted fifteen Ireland international matches, most recently against Australia "A" and South Africa in 1998.

As a result of a player shortage, the club sought demotion to Section 2 of the Senior League for the 2021 season, but did not play in the League at all.

Honours
Irish Senior Cup: 2
1985, 1991
NCU Senior League: 6 (1 shared)
1968, 1974, 1975, 1983, 1986 (shared), 1994
NCU Challenge Cup: 7
1923, 1945, 1953, 1966, 1977, 1984, 1997
NCU Junior Cup: †4
†1954, †1973, †1974, †1975

† Won by 2nd XI

References

External links
Downpatrick Cricket Club

Cricket clubs in County Down
Downpatrick
Cricket clubs in Northern Ireland